This is a list of companies listed on the Malaysia Exchange (MYX) under the Main Market, ordered alphabetically. The names of the companies appear exactly as they do on the stock exchange listing. This is not an exhaustive list, but reflects the list that appears on the Main Market as of 10 April 2017.

!-9

A

B

C

D

E

F

G

H

I

J

K

L

M

N

O

P

Q

R

S

T

U

V

W

X

Y

Z

External links
List of companies listed on the Malaysia Exchange under the Main Market, bursamalaysia.com 
List of companies listed on the Malaysia Exchange under the ACE Market, bursamalaysia.com

 
Malaysia
Malaysia Exchange